Anna Ellinor Eriksson (born 10 June 1988) is a Swedish Social Democratic politician who was leader of the Swedish Social Democratic Youth League (SSU) from 2014 to 2015.

She served as general secretary of SSU from 2011 to October 2014 when she replaced Gabriel Wikström as leader, following his appointment as Minister for Public Health, Healthcare and Sports of in the Löfven Cabinet.
Eriksson has studied psychology at Karolinska Institutet but did not completed her studies. She lives in Stockholm.

Early life and career 

Born in Valbo in East Central Sweden, she has been a member of SSU since she was 15. 
Eriksson served as one of ten vice presidents of the Young European Socialists for the period 2013–2015.

In the 2014 European Parliament electionin Sweden she was in the 7th spot on the Swedish Social Democratic Party list; the party obtained five seats.

References 

1988 births
Living people
Swedish Social Democratic Party politicians
21st-century Swedish women politicians